Tay Forest Park is forest park in the council area of Perth and Kinross in Scotland. It consists of a network of forests managed by Forestry and Land Scotland (FLS) that are spread across the Highland parts of Perthshire, and covers 194 km2 in total. The park contains a series of disparate woods that are managed for multiple benefits, with an emphasis on recreation facilities for visitors.

The park's main visitor centre is at Queen's View, near Loch Tummel, where there is a café, gift shop and interpretive displays. Other smaller centres are located at the following locations:

Allean, also close to Loch Tummel
Faskally, between Pitlochry and Killiecrankie
Carie on the south side of Loch Rannoch
Grandtully, between Aberfeldy and Ballinluig
Weem, north of Aberfeldy
Drummond Hill on the north side of Loch Tay
Craigvinean, near Dunkeld and Birnam

At each location there is a car park and waymarked trails for visitors. Some of the site have more facilities, such as toilets.

Gallery

References

External links
Forest Park - Forestry and Land Scotland

Forest parks of Scotland
Protected areas of Perth and Kinross